Mavronoros is a village of the Grevena municipality. Before the 2011 local government reform it was a part of the municipality of Theodoros Ziakas. The 2011 census recorded 78 residents in the village. Mavronoros is a part of the community of Mavranaioi.

See also
 List of settlements in the Grevena regional unit

References

Populated places in Grevena (regional unit)